The Family Planning Association of India (FPA India) is a registered charity in India. Established in 1949 by Dhanvanthi Rama Rau and Avabai Bomanji Wadia, the organisation has 40 local branches across the country that promote sexual health and family planning. It is the national affiliate of the International Planned Parenthood Federation. Among other issues, the organisation promotes reproductive choices, legal and safe abortion, education about sexually transmitted diseases and sexual and reproductive health. FPA India has 39 permanent clinics under them. The current national president is Dr. Rathnamala M. Desai. FPA India is a social impact organisation delivering essential health services focusing on sexual and reproductive health in 18 states of India.

Local branches 
The local branches of FPA India are:
Agra Branch, Ahmedabad Branch, Bangalore Branch, Belgaum Branch, Bellary Branch, Bhopal Branch, Bhubaneswar Branch, Bidar Branch, Bijapur Branch, Chennai Branch, Dharwad Branch, Dindigul Branch, Gomia Branch, Gwalior Branch, Hyderabad Branch, Indore Branch, Jabalpur Branch, Jaipur Branch, Kalchini Branch, Kolkata Branch, Lucknow Branch, Madurai Branch, Mohali Branch, Mumbai Branch, Mysore Branch, Nagaland Branch, New Delhi Branch, Nilgiris Branch, North Kanara Branch, Panchkula Branch, Patna Branch, Pune Branch, Raichur Branch, Rajkot Branch, Shimoga Branch, Singhbhum Branch, Solapur Branch, South Kanara Branch, Srinagar Branch, Trivandrum Branch, and Yamunanagar Branch.

Collaborating partners 
 National Integrated Medical Association (NIMA)
 Federation of Indian Chambers of Commerce and Industry (FICCI)
 Packard Foundation
 Planned Parenthood Federation of America, University of Rochester, United States
 Japan Trust Fund
 UNFPA
 West Wind Foundation
 Ford Foundation
 Government of India
 State AIDS Cell
 Family Health International (FHI)
 Centre for Operations Research and Training (CORT)
 Humanas
 Avert Society

References

External links 

 

 FPA India

Social welfare charities
1949 establishments in India
Health charities in India
Birth control in India
International Planned Parenthood Federation affiliates
Organizations established in 1949
Family in India